The Democratic Peasants' Party–Lupu was a political party in Romania.

History
The party was established on 20 January 1946 as a breakaway from the National Peasants' Party (PNȚ). Led by Nicolae L. Lupu, it contested the November 1946 elections, winning two seats. Despite its vote share falling from 2.4% to 0.7%, the party retained its two seats in the 1948 elections. However, they were the last multi-party elections held until 1990.

Electoral history

Legislative elections

References

1946 establishments in Romania
Agrarian parties in Romania
Defunct socialist parties in Romania
National Peasants' Party breakaway groups
Political parties established in 1946
Political parties with year of disestablishment missing